Jorge Stewart was an Argentine rugby union footballer, president of San Isidro Club. and vice president of the Argentine Rugby Union.

Career 

Stewart was born in Buenos Aires around 1900. In the 1920s, he began his career in the Club Atlético San Isidro. In 1935 was sanctioned together with other San Isidro players, by the executive committee of the CASI. That same year he participated in the founding of the SIC. Stewart was the captain of the team in 1936. 

On May 3, 1936, the San Isidro Club played its first match against Olivos Rugby Club, with a score 7–6 in favor of Olivos. He also played for the national team, his first test match was against South Africa, on July 16, 1932.  

Jorge Stewart was president of the San Isidro Club, between April 26, 1950, and May 10, 1954.

Titles 
C.A. San Isidro
 Torneo de la URBA (5): 1929, 1930, 1933, 1934, 1939

References

External links 
www.rugbytime.com

Rugby union players from Buenos Aires
Argentine people of English descent
Argentine people of Scottish descent
Argentina international rugby union players
Argentine rugby union players
San Isidro Club rugby union players